The 2014–15 Hockeyettan season was the 16th season that Hockeyettan (up until this season referred to mainly as Division 1) has functioned as the third tier of ice hockey in Sweden, organized by the Swedish Ice Hockey Association (SIHA). The initial groups began on 21 September 2014 and ended on 10 December 2014. The following Allettan groups and continuation groups started on 27 December 2014 and finished on 15 February 2015. The promotion playoffs to the HockeyAllsvenskan qualifier began on 19 February 2015 and ended on 6–7 March 2015. The Hockeyettan qualifiers began on 1 March 2015 and ended on 25 March 2015. The HockeyAllsvenskan qualifier began on 12 March 2015 and ended on 4 April 2015.

Format
The 2014–15 Hockeyettan season will feature 47 teams divided into four geographical groups: Norra ("North"), Östra ("East"), Västra ("West"), and Södra ("South"). This is a contraction compared to the previous season, which featured 53 teams divided into five groups. With the exception of Hockeyettan North which will have 11 teams, each of the groups will consist of 12 teams. At the end of the groups in December, the top four teams in each of the Hockeyettan North and Hockeyettan East groups will qualify for the Allettan Norra group, and the top four teams in each of the Hockeyettan West and Hockeyettan South groups will qualify for the Allettan Södra group, after Christmas. Meanwhile, the remaining teams in each starting group will continue playing in their starting group ("continuation group") after Christmas. In the continuation groups, the teams will be given extra points dependent on their ranking in their initial group; the lowest-ranked team gets 0 points, the second-lowest-ranked team gets 1 point, the third-lowest-ranked team gets 2 points, and so on. The two Allettan winners will go directly to the 2015 HockeyAllsvenskan qualifier (Swedish: Kvalserien till HockeyAllsvenskan), which determines promotion to the second-tier league HockeyAllsvenskan. The top two teams in each of the four continuation groups, as well as the teams ranked 2–5 in each of the two Allettan groups, will qualify for the promotion playoffs, which are played in three rounds—PlayOff 1, 2, and 3—and battle to reach the HockeyAllsvenskan qualifier. Each playoff team will start in PlayOff 1, unlike previous seasons where a certain team's placement in their spring group affected whether that team started in PlayOff 1, 2 or 3. The worst-ranked team in the Norra continuation group, and the two worst-ranked teams in each of the three other continuation groups, will have to play in the Hockeyettan qualifier round-robin tournament (Swedish: Kvalserien till Hockeyettan) for their region to avoid relegation to Division 2, the fourth-tier league. In each of the four Hockeyettan qualifiers, the Hockeyettan team(s) will face four of the best teams from the four Division 2 regions. The North Hockeyettan team will face all four teams from Division 2 North; the East Hockeyettan teams will face two teams from Division 2 East, one from Division 2 West and one from Division 2 South; the West Hockeyettan teams will face two teams from Division 2 West, one from Division 2 East and one from Division 2 South; and the Hockeyettan South teams will face two teams from Division 2 South, one from Division 2 East and one from Division 2 West. Per the 2014–15 season format, only the top-ranked team from each of the four qualifiers will be guaranteed a spot in Hockeyettan for the 2015–16 season. The two remaining playoff teams after PlayOff 3 will join the two Allettan winners and the two lowest-ranked teams in HockeyAllsvenskan in the 2015 HockeyAllsvenskan qualifier, where the teams will play a double round-robin tournament and battle for four spots in HockeyAllsvenskan for the 2015–16 season. The remaining teams in the Allettan groups and the continuation groups will remain in Hockeyettan for the 2015–16 season. All groups that are formed in the season, including the initial ones and the qualifiers for HockeyAllsvenskan and Hockeyettan, will be played as double round-robins, with each team playing the other teams in their group once at home and once on the road.

Per the format in the 2014–15 season, the 2015–16 season would be contracted down to 42 teams. It would mark the league's fifth contraction in six seasons, with the first contraction occurring in the 2010–11 season (down to 57 teams from 58). However, the SIHA may promote more teams from the Hockeyettan qualifiers than planned, depending on if teams from HockeyAllsvenskan are relegated and what groups those teams are placed in for the 2015–16 season.

Playing format
Each game consists of three 20-minute regulation periods, for a total of 60 minutes. After the 60 regulation minutes, the team with the most goals scored wins the game. If a non-playoff game is tied after regulation time, a five-minute overtime period ensues, in which the team scoring the next goal wins the game. If no team scores during the overtime period, a shootout ensues, with each team taking three penalty shots against the opposing team's goaltender. If the game is still tied after the three penalty shot rounds, additional rounds ensue until one team scores and the other team doesn't. In non-playoff games, points are awarded for each game, with a win in regulation time giving 3 points, an overtime/shootout win 2 points, an overtime/shootout loss 1 point, and a regulation loss 0 points. In the promotion playoffs, if a game is tied after regulation time, 20-minute overtime periods ensue until one team scores and wins the game.

Tiebreak
In group play, if two or more teams end up tied in points, the following tiebreakers are used:
Better goal difference;
Higher number of goals scored;
Results in games between the tied teams.

Participating clubs
Per the playing format in the previous season, Hockeyettan would be contracted by 10 teams for the 2014–15 season. The SIHA originally planned to have 48 teams in this season but eventually decided to have only 11 teams in Hockeyettan North, giving a total of 47 teams. The East, West, and South groups all have 12 teams each. The previous season featured 53 teams divided into five groups. The SIHA promoted the four second-placed teams from Hockeyettan qualifiers C–F to get 47 teams in the 2014–15 season. However, two of those 47 qualified teams pulled out of the league during the preseason, resulting in two other teams being promoted from the qualifiers:
 Nyköpings HK, who had qualified by reaching Allettan Central and been placed in the West group, went bankrupt on 15 April 2014 and ceased to exist. In response, the SIHA promoted third-placed Varberg Vipers from qualifier F and placed them in the South group; moved HC Dalen from the West group to the South group; and moved Västerviks IK and Vimmerby HC from the South group to the West group.
 Falu IF, who won qualifier C and were seated in the West group, demanded relegation to Division 2 on 13 May 2014 due to financial problems. The SIHA responded by promoting third-placed Grästorps IK from qualifier E to replace Falu's spot in Hockeyettan West.

r = Relegated from 2013–14 HockeyAllsvenskanp = Promoted from 2013–14 Division 2

Team map

Initial groups

Hockeyettan North

Source:

Hockeyettan East

Source:

Hockeyettan West

Source:

Hockeyettan South

Source:

AllEttan groups

AllEttan North

AllEttan South

Continuation groups

Hockeyettan North continuation

Hockeyettan East continuation

Hockeyettan West continuation

Hockeyettan South continuation

Playoffs
Teams 2–5 from the AllEttan groups and teams 1–2 from the continuation groups meet in a three-round playoff, each round best of three games. The two remaining teams at the end of the three playoff rounds join the AllEttan group winners (as well as teams 13–14 from the 2014–15 HockeyAllsvenskan season) in the HockeyAllsvenskan qualifiers.

Playoff 1

Östersund vs Kovland (2–0)

Huddinge vs Haninge (2–1)

Piteå vs Örnsköldsvik (2–0)

Hudiksvall vs Åker/Strängnäs (2–0)

Troja/Ljungby vs Kumla (2–0)

Tingsryd vs Kallinge-Ronneby (2–0)

Västervik vs Mariestad (2–0)

Kristianstad vs Helsingborg (2–1)

Playoff 2

Kristianstad vs Tingsryd (0–2)

Västervik vs Hudiksvall (2–0)

Huddinge vs Östersund (2–1)

Piteå vs Troja/Ljungby (0–2)

Playoff 3

Västervik vs Troja/Ljungby (2–1)

Huddinge vs Tingsryd (0–2)

Hockeyettan qualifiers
In the Hockeyettan qualifying groups, only the group winner was guaranteed a spot in the 2015–16 Hockeyettan season. Additional teams were to be selected by the Hockey Association to correct for re-alignment of teams, and for the promotion of Sundsvall, Tingsryd, and Pantern to HockeyAllsvenskan.

The result of the qualifiers was the promotion of Brunflo IK, AIK Hockey Härnösand, Sollentuna HC and Köping HC, and the relegation of Värmdö HC. The net gain of three clubs was due to the expansion of the SHL from 12 teams to 14, as well as the expansion of Hockeyettan North from 11 teams to 12.

Qualifier A
Qualifier A was contested by SK Lejon from Hockeyettan North and Brunflo IK, AIK Hockey Härnösand, and Bodens HF from Division 2. SK Lejon won the group and thereby secured a spot in Hockeyettan for the following season.

Hockeyettan North consisted of only 11 teams for the 2014–15 season rather than 12. This empty spot was to be filled for the following season. Furthermore, IF Sundsvall Hockey was promoted to HockeyAllsvenskan. These two vacancies were filled by Brunflo and Härnösand who finished 2nd and 3rd in this qualifier.

Source:

Qualifier B
Vallentuna BK won qualifying group B, and thereby secured continued play in Hockeyettan for the 2015–16 season. Värmdö HC finished 3rd and were relegated. Sollentuna HC from Division 2 finished second, and were promoted to Hockeyettan after Södertälje SK's relegation from HockeyAllsvenskan to Hockeyettan East was compensated by moving Enköpings SK to the western group.

Source:

Qualifier C
Surahammars IF re-qualified for Hockeyettan by winning qualifying group C. Off-season group re-alignment moved Västervik and Vimmerby to the southern group and brought in Enköping from the eastern group, resulting in a net addition of one spot in Hockeyettan West. This allowed second-place IFK Arboga IK to re-qualify and third-place Köping HC to be promoted to fill the vacancy.

Source:

Qualifier D
Mörrums GoIS IK won the group and secured continued play in Hockeyettan for the 2015–16 season. The promotion of Tingsryd and Pantern to HockeyAllsvenskan was compensated by moving Västervik and Vimmerby to Hockeyettan South, resulting in zero net change for the southern group. This allowed Tyringe SoSS who finished second in the group to retain their spot.

Source:

References

3
Hockeyettan seasons